Kurin is a rural locality (a khutor) in Mikhaylovka Urban Okrug, Volgograd Oblast, Russia. The population was 56 as of 2010. There are 4 streets.

Geography 
Kurin is located 37 km southwest of Mikhaylovka. Demochkin is the nearest rural locality.

References 

Rural localities in Mikhaylovka urban okrug